Spatuloricaria puganensis, sometimes known as the longtail pleco, is a species of catfish in the family Loricariidae. It is native to South America, where it occurs in the Marañón River basin in Peru. The species reaches 22 cm (8.7 inches) in length.

References 

Loricariidae
Species described in 1937
Catfish of South America
Fish of Peru